Antonio Lante Montefeltro della Rovere (1648 – 5 May 1716) was an Italian nobleman of the House of della Rovere and was Duke of Bomarzo and Prince of Belmonte.

Lante was the son of Ippolito Lante Montefeltro della Rovere and Maria Cristina d'Altemps. He inherited his father's titles and became the second Duke of Bomarzo. When the Lante family purchased the comune of Belmonte from the Mattei (presumably on the death of Luigi Mattei in 1675), Lante became the first Prince of Belmonte.

Thereafter, Lante travelled to Paris. While there, in February 1683, Lante married Louise Angelique Charlotte de La Trémouille (1653–1698), sister of Marie Anne de La Trémoille, and they had 6 children. The two returned to Rome but travelled between the two capitals. When Trémouille died in 1698, in Paris, Lante returned to Rome though a number of his children stayed behind and were appointed to various titles by French and Spanish monarchs.

 Duca Luigi Lante Montefeltro della Rovere (1683–1727), inherited his father's titles and married Angela Maria Vaini, daughter of Guido Vaini, 1st Prince of Cantalupo, Duca di Selci, Marchese di Vacona, Signore di Gavignano, and Maria Anna Ceuli dei Marchesi del Carretto.
Artemisia Lante Montefeltro della Rovere (1690–1692)
 Alessandro Lante Montefeltro della Rovere (born 1691), made Duke of Santo-Gemini by Louis I of Spain and married Francisca Xaviera Fernández de Córdoba Carrillo y Mendoza, Marchioness of the Casta, Countess of Alacuás, Baroness of Bolbaite
Princesse Marie Anne Césarine Lante Montefeltro della Rovere (1693–1753), married Jean-Baptiste de Croÿ (1686–1737)
Federico Marcello Lante Montefeltro della Rovere (1694–1774), elevated to Cardinal

Ancestry

References

1648 births
1716 deaths
Dukes of Italy
Princes of Belmonte
Della Rovere family